= Hexenbrett =

Austrian metal band

Hexenbrett is an Austrian black metal band. They released two EPs and two albums, three of them on Dying Victims Productions.

== Discography ==
- Erste Beschwörung (EP, 2018)
- Zweite Beschwörung: Ein Kind zu töten (2020, Dying Victims Productions)
- Intermezzo dei quattro coltelli nudi (EP, 2021, Dying Victims Productions)
- Dritte Beschwörung: Dem Teufel eine Tochter (2024, Dying Victims Productions)
